Technical Design Labs (TDL), founded 1976 by Carl Galletti and Roger Amidon, was an early producer of personal computers. TDL was based in Princeton, New Jersey, USA in the 1970s and early 1980s.

The company was later (1978) renamed Xitan, in honor of its primary product.

In 1979, Neil Colvin formed what was then called Phoenix Software Associates after his prior employer, Xitan, went out of business.  Neil hired Dave Hirschman, a former Xitan employee.

In 1979 Carl Galletti and Roger Amidon had started a new business called Computer Design Labs that acquired the rights to all TDL software.

Products
The company's Xitan had an S-100 bus and a Z-80-based CPU came in two configurations: the base Alpha 1 model and the Alpha 2.

Other products from TDL for the Xitan and S-100 Z80-based computer systems:
Zapple Monitor
Micro-Seed a database management system for Xitan Z80 microprocessors.
Z-Tel a text editing language for Z80 microprocessors.
Video Display Board (VDB) for S-100 bus computers; capable of displaying text (25 rows x 80 characters) and graphics (160 x 75) that could display on a modified television.
Interface One a 'plug-in' wiring board for development.

See also
 Epson QX-10

References

External links
 Carl Galletti's Homepage
 Roger Amidon's Homepage
 Product brochure
 Technical Design Labs (TDL) - History
 Technical Design Labs (TDL), Herb's S-100 Stuff Preserving S-100 for decades
 Technical Design Labs (TDL) (Princeton, N.J.) Classic Tech

1976 establishments in New Jersey
1979 disestablishments in New Jersey
American companies established in 1976
American companies disestablished in 1979
Computer companies established in 1976
Computer companies disestablished in 1979
Defunct computer companies of the United States
Defunct computer hardware companies